"Burning Chrome" is a science fiction short story by Canadian-American writer William Gibson, first published in Omni in July 1982. Gibson first read the story at a science fiction convention in Denver, Colorado in the autumn of 1981, to an audience of four people, among them Bruce Sterling (who Gibson later said "completely got it"). It was nominated for a Nebula Award in 1983 and collected with the rest of Gibson's early short fiction in a 1986 volume of the same name.

Plot
"Burning Chrome" tells the story of two freelance hackers—Automatic Jack, the narrator and a hardware specialist; and Bobby Quine, a software expert. Bobby becomes infatuated with a girl named Rikki and wants to become wealthy in order to impress her. Jack has acquired a powerful Russian "icebreaker" program that can penetrate corporate security systems. Bobby suggests that they use it to break into the system of a notorious and vicious criminal known as Chrome, who handles money transfers for organized crime, and Jack reluctantly agrees to help. The break-in is successful, and Jack and Bobby empty Chrome's bank accounts, but they discover afterward that Rikki had been working in a brothel with ties to Chrome. She uses her earnings to buy a set of cybernetic eye implants for herself and go to Hollywood; however, Jack uses his money to switch her plane ticket to Chiba City, where Rikki has always dreamed of going. He buys her a return ticket as well but she never uses it. The news leaves both men devastated, as they have grown to love her, and Jack never sees her again.

Connection to other works

The story was one of the first of Gibson's to be set in the Sprawl, and functioned as a conceptual prototype for Gibson's Sprawl trilogy of novels.

Bobby Quine is mentioned in Neuromancer as one of the mentors of the protagonist. The Finn, a recurring character in Gibson's Sprawl trilogy, makes his first appearance in this story as a minor figure. The events of the story are referenced in Count Zero, the second entry of the Sprawl trilogy.

Reception 

The word "cyberspace", coined by Gibson, was first used in this story, in reference to the "mass consensual hallucination" in computer networks.

One line from the story—"...the street finds its own uses for things"—has become a widely quoted aphorism for describing the sometimes unexpected uses to which users can put technologies (for example, hip-hop DJs' reinvention of the turntable, which transformed turntables from a medium of playback into one of production). 

Gibson wrote a screenplay for a film adaptation to be directed by Kathryn Bigelow, but the project did not come to fruition.

The BBC did an hour-long version of the story, first broadcast on BBC Radio 7 (now BBC Radio 4 Extra) on 19 Oct 2007 and read by Adam Sims.

References

1982 short stories
Cyberpunk short stories
Science fiction short stories
Short stories by William Gibson
Works originally published in Omni (magazine)